Peter King may refer to:

Music
 Pete King (composer) (1914–1982), American
 Pete King (saxophonist) (1929–2009), English jazz, manager of Ronnie Scott's club
 Peter King (Nigerian musician) (born 1938), Nigerian saxophonist
 Peter King (saxophonist) (1940–2020), English jazz, worked with Charlie Watts
 Pete King (British musician) (1958–1987), British rock drummer

Politics
 Peter King, 1st Baron King (1669–1734), Lord Chancellor of England
 Peter King, 7th Baron King (1776–1833), English aristocrat, politician, and economic writer
 Peter King, 5th Earl of Lovelace (1951–2018), British peer
 Peter King (British politician) (1811–1885) Liberal Party MP
 Peter Maurice King (1940–2018), Australian, National Country Party
 Peter King (Australian politician) (born 1952), Liberal Party
 Peter King (Northern Ireland politician), judge and Unionist politician 
 Peter T. King (born 1944), U.S. Representative from New York

Sports
Peter King (cricketer) (born 1959), Australian
Peter King (footballer, born 1943) (born 1943), English footballer with Cardiff City
Peter King (footballer, born 1964) (1964–2012), English footballer with Crewe Alexandra
Peter King (Gaelic footballer) (born 1983), Irish

Other
 Peter King (British Army officer) (1916–1962), during World War II
 Peter King (make-up artist) (born 1955), for the film The Lord of the Rings: The Return of the King
 Peter King (sportswriter) (born 1957), American writer for Sports Illustrated
 Peter King, Australian business executive, CEO of Westpac

See also 
King (surname)